Kenny Leon's True Colors Theatre Company is a 501(c)3 non-profit theatre company in Atlanta, GA co-founded by Tony-winning Broadway director Kenny Leon and Jane Bishop in 2002.  True Colors Theatre Company had their inaugural season in 2003-2004 under the leadership of co-founder and Artistic Director Kenny Leon.  True Colors Theatre Company produces world premiere plays by diverse playwrights as well as a commitment to preserving African-American classics.  There is no permanent theater space for the company, they have dubbed themselves a "moveable feast", presenting plays at the Southwest Arts Center, Theatrical Outfits Balzer Theatre, Porter Sanford III Performing Arts Center and the Rialto Center.

The educational component of True Colors Theatre Company is the August Wilson Monologue Competition, which was begun in 2007 by Kenny Leon and Todd Kreidler, dramaturg to the playwright August Wilson, after his death in 2005. In 2009 the program became a national program exposing high school students across the United States to the works of August Wilson as well as their teachers.  This educational program began in Atlanta, GA and has now spread to a total of eight regions: Atlanta, GA; Boston, MA; Chicago, IL; Los Angeles, CA; New York, NY; Pittsburgh, PA; Portland, OR and Seattle, WA.  High school students compete in their region reciting monologues from works in August Wilson's Century Cycle.  Finalists from each city advance to compete in New York City on the August Wilson Theatre stage.

In 2013, True Colors was awarded the American Theatre Wing's National Theatre Company Grant.

In 2018, Jamil Jude was named artistic director of True Colors beginning in the 2019-20 season. His motto is "True Colors thrives at the intersection of artistic excellence and civic engagement".

Works

References

 

American opera companies
501(c)(3) organizations
Musical groups established in 2002
2002 establishments in Georgia (U.S. state)
Theatre companies in Georgia (U.S. state)